Alison Leigh Forman (born 17 March 1969 in Maitland, New South Wales) is a retired Australian international soccer player. Among her accomplishments, Forman played for the Australia women's national soccer team at the 1995 and 1999 FIFA Women's World Cup finals and at the 2000 Summer Olympics in Sydney, Australia.

References

External links
 
 
 
 
 

1969 births
Living people
Australian women's soccer players
Footballers at the 2000 Summer Olympics
Olympic soccer players of Australia
1995 FIFA Women's World Cup players
People from New South Wales
Fortuna Hjørring players
1999 FIFA Women's World Cup players
Australia women's international soccer players
Women's association football midfielders
Australian expatriate sportspeople in Denmark
Expatriate women's footballers in Denmark
Australian expatriate women's soccer players
Elitedivisionen players